Fear of Flying is the second studio album by American singer-songwriter Mya, released on April 25, 2000, by University Music Entertainment and Interscope Records. Following the success of her debut album Mya (1998), Interscope promptly allocated Harrison studio time and assembled recording sessions beginning September 1999 which concluded in March 2000. For this record, Mya made the conscious decision to become involved more creatively, opting to pen her own lyrics after securing a publishing deal to launch her own publishing company as well as collaborate with a wider range of established producers and songwriters on the album. Looking to embrace a more mature sound, Harrison consulted and collaborated with a bevy of producers which included Rodney Jerkins, Swizz Beatz, Wyclef Jean, Knobody, Robin Thicke, Tricky Stewart, and Jimmy Jam & Terry Lewis.

A hip hop soul album, Mya described Fear of Flying as a metaphor for the ups and downs of life, a theme present throughout the album which includes handling things like an adult and knowing you must have faith to make anything happen. Lyrically, the album's material addressed the singer's romantic relationships which symbolized her relationship with family, friends and acquaintances. Noting that Fear of Flying is "a reflection of being in love for the very first time, experiencing success and the fears of fame."

Upon its release, the album received mixed reviews from music critics citing some of the album's "tepid material." Commercially well received, Fear of Flying debuted with a Top 20 placement at number 15 on the Billboard 200. Initially though, the album stalled on the charts until the release of the album's second single and in turn solidified Fear of Flying a hit garnering multiplatinum success. To keep the album's momentum, nearly seven months after its original release, Fear of Flying was re–released with two new additional songs on November 7, 2000.

In support of the album, three singles were released – "The Best of Me", "Case of the Ex", and "Free", which attained international chart success. Due to the album's success, Fear of Flying earned Soul Train Awards and MOBO nominations.

Considered her most expressive effort to date, Fear of Flying helped established Mya as a household name in mainstream media and redefine a golden age for R&B. In April 2020, to commemorate the album's twentieth anniversary, Universal Music Group released an expanded edition featuring over 10 rare remixes and bonus tracks.

Background

Following the commercial success of her debut Mya (1998), Mya quickly re-entered the recording studio to begin work on her second album. During her two years away, she toured with several artists, and made her film debut in the thriller In Too Deep (1999). Additionally, she was selected by Bongo jeans as their spokesperson and had a Tommy Hilfiger lipstick shade named after her. During the development stages of the album, Mya consulted several different producers for her follow-up album, including She'kspere, Knobody, Tricky Stewart, and Robin Thicke as well as Wyclef and Swizz Beatz of Ruff Ryders. A number of guest vocalists whom contributed to the project, included TLC's Lisa "Left Eye" Lopes, Jordan Knight, and Beenie Man. In addition, Harrison launched her own publishing company, Art of War.

Mya, who did some writing on her debut album, was heavily involved in the production of Fear of Flying, commenting: "I wanted to get that hands-on experience. I was involved in every single process, from writing and recording to producing, mixing, and mastering." In response to the album's material, the singer commented that many of the album's songs are about female empowerment. "I'm learning that the decisions being made ultimately affect me, so I make most of them with the insight and help of other people", she explained. "I still have to focus on what feels good to me and what's going to work in the long run, instead of selling 20 million records or being controversial." The album's title, came from a song Mya recorded by the same name—not from Erica Jong's 1973 novel of the same name. During an interview with Billboard, which discussed the title, Mya noted that while she had not been aware of the book, she later "started reading it and noticed a lot of similarities: "Fear of Flying is a metaphor for the ups and downs of life. It's about handling things like an adult, knowing you must have faith to make anything happen." Interscope hired photographer and director David LaChapelle to shoot the images for the album's packaging. While she admired the work of Dave La Chapelle, Mya revealed she cropped the original album's cover because it focused on her body, commenting, "I didn't like it. It wasn't capturing."

Development
Mya considers her first album as an experiment and a learning ground. Prior to entering a recording studio, she had no vocal training and was doing improv-breathing the whole time on every song. With Fear of Flying, she acknowledged she learned things such as how she like to work and what works right for her in the studio. On Fear of Flying, she received vocal training and noted her vocals got along better with live performances. Speaking with Time, Mya revealed with Fear of Flying she took more control over her sound and image. She commented that Fear of Flying was "an opportunity and a test."
For her second studio album, Mya wrote a lot. Openly admitting, "Writing helps me sort through feelings that I'm trying to figure out." She noted her journal is filled with curse words and exclamation points, explaining, "It's either extreme highs or extreme lows." In an interview with the New York Daily News, Mya explained that the album was "about independence." She acknowledged with Fear of Flying she became "more confident", while commenting, "I'm a lot more straightforward. Things I didn't know how to say or when to say, I'm saying now." 
During the recording process, Mya explained she clicked more with producers that like to start from scratch. Commenting, "It allowed me to be involved in the process. They were interested in what I had to say which made me feel good about myself." One particular producer Mya gelled with was Wyclef Jean. Speaking on working him, she commented, "He was interested in what I had to say. My ideas - what I had to bring to the table. He wasn't afraid to go back into the studio and change things." Robin Thicke, a then-up-and-coming producer, was another Mya meshed well with. Of his contribution to Fear of Flying Mya commented, "he is a true talent and I enjoyed working with him." While reviewing Fear of Flying, in an article, Time noted on her debut effort, Mya was a "lovestruck teen" while on Fear of Flying, "she's a woman coming face to face with romantic entanglements." With 18 tracks featured on the album, Time applauded the album to manage that rare thing: to combine captivating beats with hummable melodies. Commenting on the finished product, Time wrote, "This is hip-hop soul with plenty of pop appeal."

Music and composition
Musically, Fear of Flying has been described as a "smooth, catchy, personalized mixture of street-spice soul." According to multiple critics, the album is more focused on themes than coherency of musical style. Sonically, the album's sound veers from quiet storm tracks to hard-edged Timbaland homages to cheerleader romps. The album's focal theme is "proper behavior on the dangerous grounds of courtship" and ranges from uptempo tracks to inspirational ballads. Several of the album's 18 tracks were co-written by Mya, with Vibe magazine noting in an article that "Mýa tackles difficult melodic and rhythmic twists without ditching a nice conversational tone." Fear of Flying opens with an intro courtesy of Swizz Beatz. Titled, "Turn It Up" it features a stop-start beat and samples of a cooing baby. Next up, "Case of the Ex," a song structured around producer Tricky Stewart's "driving, Beethoven-meets-Timbaland" chord changes, where Mýa expresses distrust in her lover. It is built around a catchy yet fairly complicated chorus and clever lyrics. It is followed by the "dramatic" "Ride & Shake", which was compared to the work of Whitney Houston. The mildy racy Rodney Jerkins-produced "That's Why I Wanna Fight" is a sensuous midtempo and served as the album's fourth track. Structured, similarly to Marvin Gaye's 70s material, Harrison adopts Gaye's double singing technique. Track five, the dance-oriented imaginative "Pussycats" is a nursery rhyme-influenced song produced by Wyclef Jean and Jerry Duplessis. A frisky jam, it samples the sound of mewing cats.

The album's "combative" sixth track, "The Best of Me", was produced by Swizz Beatz, and features Jadakiss. Described as "edgy" and "street savvy," Mya commented on the message behind the song, suggesting, "It's about setting standards for yourself, about following them through and not allowing the temptations of a heat of the moment situation to lure you into something that you may regret later in life." Described as "mildy structure," the album's seventh track "Lie Detector," is another midtempo which finds Mya refusing advances. The TLC-sounding "How You Gonna Tell Me" courtesy of She'kspere and Kandi has Mya telling her girlfriend to spare her bad advice. Lyrically and conceptually, Mya opted to add her thoughts to the song, explaining, "I wanted the song to be about people preaching to me what they don't practice. About how these specific people speak to me on the way I should live and my reaction to them and their twisted lives."  While the "dance-floor-ready" "Takin' Me Over," produced by Robin Thicke featuring Lisa "Left Eye" Lopes, begins with Mya acting like the women she has expressed dislike for, while holed up in her bathroom with hair products. A catchy slice of retro soul, "Takin' Me Over" is '60s Motown meets early '00s and shows Mya in a playful coy mood. Mya dubs it her "don't give a damn song."

The lush title track, "Fear of Flying" is a folk-ish quasi ballad produced by Knobody and uses the idea of being afraid to fly as a metaphor for other issues. The Soulshock and Karlin production, "Can't Believe", and remake of Michael Jackson's "The Lady In My Life", titled "Man In My Life", are standard fare A/C broken-hearted emotional ballads, while on a romantic note, the ballad "No Tears On My Pillow" written by Mya and the song's producer Robin Thicke served as the album's fifteenth track. Followed by "For the First Time" a sexual surrender cut produced by Swing Mob member Daryl Pearson. The album's closing track, an outro, "Get Over" is a spoken word "thank you" midtempo with calypso tinge.

Release and promotion

Initially set for a late 1999 release, Fear of Flying was later scheduled for a February 2000 release, before Interscope settled on an April 25, 2000, release date. In Germany, it was released June 19, 2000, while in the United Kingdom, the album was released on July 24, 2000. Interscope hoped that the album would attract both pop and R&B/hip-hop audiences, with Steve Stoute, president of black music and executive VP for Interscope-Geffen-A&M commenting that all marketing surrounding the album's release would "be paying attention to the street audiences with this album." He added, "We're also looking to build upon her previous success. She gained a large pop audience through 'Ghetto Supastar' and 'Take Me There.' She's also grown as an artist and her music reflects that." In early April 2000, Billboard reported that Mya was set to attend MTV's annual Spring Break special in Cancun. Additionally, in that same article, it mentioned that Mya was due to tape an episode of Total Request Live. On May 26, 2000, ABC aired their "25 Hottest Stars Under 25" special which Mya was a part of. In June 2000, Mya joined the Southern California leg of Nickelodeon's All That! Music and More Festival. In July 2000, Mya appeared on the show Farmclub.com; her appearance aired on July 10, 2000, on USA Network. In mid-2000, Mya opened for Montell Jordan on his European tour; during a Vibe interview it mentioned that she was heading to Germany to begin the tour. On December 6, 2000, Mya made an appearance on Live with Regis and Kelly.

In February 2001, during All Star weekend Mya performed at the fifth annual NBA Team Up Celebration which was held at Constitution Hall. On February 20, Mýa made an appearance on The Rosie O'Donnell Show.
 The following day after she was invited as a presenter at the 43rd Grammy Awards ceremony. Mya co-hosted and performed at the 2001 Soul Train Music Awards which was held on February 28, 2001, at the Shrine Auditorium in Los Angeles. In March 2001, Mya was a part of Janet Jackson's MTV Icon special, during which she performed in the dance tribute. After serving as an opening act on other featured tours, Mýa branched out on her own and embarked on her first headlining tour. Entitled, the Fear of Flying Tour, the outing was an eleven-day city tour that began on March 21, 2001, and concluded April 1, 2001. On April 17, 2001, Mya performed on The Queen Latifah Show. On June 15, 2001, she made an appearance on Live! with Regis and Kelly ; Seven days later Mya went on The Daily Show. On July 4, 2001, it was announced that she was added to the performer lineup at the York State Fair. On July 14, Mya performed in concert at Six Flags St. Louis. On August 9, she performed at the Wisconsin State Fair;
 the following day Mya performed at the Ohio State Fair On September 7, 2001, Mya performed at Michael Jackson's 30th anniversary concert which was televised. To continue promoting the album, Mya appeared on MTV's Music in High Places, a music and travelogue series where recording artists travel to exotic sites for a series of acoustic concerts.
She performed acoustic rendition of her songs while in Sicily, Italy, performing a set comprising her songs "Free", "Ghetto Superstar", "I'll Be There", "Movin' On", "Sweet Thing", "The Best of Me", among others. Her episode aired on December 20, 2001.

On November 7, 2000, Fear of Flying was re-released with a revised track listing which featured the single "Free" and a new track titled "Again & Again". The repackaged edition of the album was released on February 19, 2001, in the United Kingdom and on May 8, 2001, in Germany. The UK reissue is notable for containing the track "Whatever Chick", a song that would later be featured on her third studio album Moodring (2003), appearing there in a reworked and explicit version, retitled "Whatever Bitch". The Australian reissue of Fear of Flying also contained the exclusive tracks "Girls Like That" and "Telephone Games."

Singles
In support of the album, Interscope Records released three singles from Fear of Flying. Initially, before "The Best of Me" was chosen as the album's lead single, the song "Lie Detector" was considered as a potential contender. The instrumental for "The Best of Me" was originally expected to be used and recorded by rapper DMX in a Miami recording session with Swizz. However, the instrumental of the song was left unused until the producer returned to New York City to start work on Mya's album at The Hit Factory. Upon accidentally pushing a button in the studio, Mya's management reportedly "jumped up and said 'That's it, that's it'" when they heard the songs instrumental. The record was among the last tracks that were recorded for the album. Jadakiss, a then member of the Ruff Ryders Entertainment's group The LOX, was chosen as the featured artist on the song as a result of label connections with Interscope Records. Released on March 6, 2000, "The Best of Me" peaked at number 50 on the Billboard Hot 100 and number 14 on the Hot R&B/Hip-Hop Songs chart. Internationally, the single found modest chart success peaking at number 26 in Germany, while charting moderately in Netherlands and Switzerland.

The second single, "Case of the Ex", was released commercially on August 28, 2000. Originally a rap song, producer Tricky Stewart heavily rearranged the track to make it fit Mya's persona. The song peaked at number two on the Billboard Hot 100 and number 10 on the Hot R&B/Hip-Hop Songs chart. Globally, "Case of the Ex" experienced similar success, peaking at number one in Australia for two weeks and earned a platinum certification from the Australian Recording Industry Association. In the United Kingdom the song charted within the top 10 and earned a silver certification from the British Phonographic Industry. Elsewhere in Europe the song peaked within the Top 40 in The Netherlands, Belgium, Ireland, Scotland, France and Germany.

The third and final single released from the album, "Free", originally appeared on the original soundtrack to the crime comedy film Bait (2000) starring Jamie Foxx. The track was written and produced by Jimmy Jam & Terry Lewis. "Free" reached number 42 on the Billboard Hot 100 and number 52 on the Hot R&B/Hip-Hop Songs chart. Meanwhile, internationally, "Free" performed even better peaking within the top 10 in Australia, the song received a platinum certification from the Australian Recording Industry Association. Elsewhere, the song charted within the top 20 in United Kingdom and Poland, and within the top 40 in Ireland and Scotland.

Critical reception

People named Fear of Flying their Album of the Week and called it an "unexpected treat", though commenting that "Mya offers no bold new sonic innovations. She does breathe life and sass into a genre too long held hostage by formula." In his review for AllMusic, Jon Azpiri wrote that "Mya's sophomore effort proves that she is a promising young talent, but still has yet to develop the chops necessary to rank among the best of R&B divas." He felt that "without the energy of collaborators in the mix, many of her solo tracks wander into predictability. The album relies too heavily on tepid ballads such as the title track and 'Man of My Life'. Yet songs like 'Can't Believe', "For the First Time', and 'Lie Detector' show an emotional depth that lacked in her debut." Josh Tyrangiel of Entertainment Weekly gave the album a C rating. He found that "Mýa can sing well enough; now she needs to find something to sing about." Rolling Stone magazine writer Ernest Hardy gave the album 2 stars out of 5 and wrote: "The signature quiver in Mya's voice does give her some sonic identity, but otherwise this could be the music of Destiny's Child, Aaliyah or any of the countless interchangeable hip-hop/R&B divas."

The Source magazine gave the album a positive review, writing, "reaching out to hip-hop heads [...] Mya proves she can hold her own in this competitive game of young female musicians. She's well on her way [to] the class of elite divas". Uncut called the album a "crafted, coffee-rich affair blending soul and swing [...] it's a grower which oozes class." While Q magazine rated the album 3 stars out of 5 and wrote: "Mya demonstrates enough sass to suggest a sunny future." Vibe stated that "the starlet has decided to show off her range [...] as if she and her top-notch producers attempted to wipe out the competition by transforming Mya into each of her rivals in turn [...] a grand tour through the ever-changing moods of female adolescence".

Accolades

Commercial performance
In the United States, Fear of Flying debuted and peaked at number 15 on the Billboard 200 and at number seven on the Top R&B/Hip-Hop Albums chart with first-week sales of 72,000 copies sold. In its second and third week, the album sold an estimated 42,784 and 33,907 copies, respectively. Thirteen weeks after its release, the album sat at number 109 on the Billboard 200. During its chart run, Fear of Flying remained on the Billboard 200 for a total of 52 consecutive weeks. Towards the end of 2000, Billboard ranked the album as the 144th best-selling album in the US, while at the end of 2001 it was ranked as the 178th best-selling album. On June 8, 2000, the album was certified gold by the Recording Industry Association of America (RIAA) denoting shipments in excess of 500,000 copies. While on March 28, 2001, the album was certified platinum by the RIAA. By May 2003, the album had sold 1.2 million copies in the United States alone, according to Nielsen SoundScan.

In Canada the album debuted at number 51 on [[RPM (magazine)|''RPM s Top Albums/CDs]] chart, during the week of May 15, 2000. In its second week on the chart it rose 12 spots to its peak position of number 39, during the week ending on May 22, 2000. In total Fear of Flying spent nine consecutive weeks on the Top Albums/CDs chart. On January 15, 2001, the album was certified gold by Music Canada for denoting shipments of 50,000 copies. In Germany, the album debuted at number 52 on July 3, 2000, where it stayed at its peak position for a total of two weeks; in total it has spent 16 consecutive weeks on the German Albums Chart.

In Australia it debuted at number 54 on the Australian Albums Chart and reached number 28 in its 18th non-consecutive week.  It spent a total of 25 non-consecutive weeks on the chart and was eventually certified gold by the Australian Recording Industry Association (ARIA) in September 2001. In Switzerland, the album debuted at number 84 on July 16, 2000. It reached its peak at number 33, 6 weeks later on August 20, 2000. Overall, the album has spent a total of 16 consecutive weeks on the Swiss Albums Chart. For the week of February 25, 2001 - March 3, 2001 the album debuted and peaked at number 81 on the UK Albums Chart. In its 12th week on the UK R&B Albums chart it peaked at number 17, during the week of June 10, 2001 -  June 16, 2001. By May 18, 2001, worldwide sales for Fear of Flying (2000) stood at six million copies sold combined with sales from Mya's debut album.

Legacy
Author Stacy-Deanne noted Fear of Flying took Mya to "new heights" and helped establish her as a household name in mainstream media. Acknowledging, with Fear of Flying it exemplified why fans truly appreciated her music, commenting and praising the effort as "poetic", "sexy", "passionate", and "honest sensitivity". She expressed, Fear of Flying had succeeded in a way that the first album had not...it had "crossover appeal." In the midst of her success, Deanne opined Harrison had develop as a well rounded-performer with flexible abilities who was consistently a "source of attraction" on television and on tour. Essentially, Deanne dubbed Fear of Flying as Harrison's most expressive effort.

In November 2007, The Guardian featured Fear of Flying on its "1000 albums to hear before you die" list, lauding Fear of Flying as "a new golden age for R&B", while noting that Mya's "lightly melismatic vocals suited these rhythmically tricksy tales, capturing perfectly the highly charged sadness of a dead affair."

Billboard acknowledged "How You Gonna Tell Me" and ranked the song at number thirty-two on their 40 Best Deep Cuts of 2000 list, while noting,"Tell Me" would've made a much likelier hit than the tepid "Best of Me."

Track listing

Notes
  signifies a vocal producer
  signifies an additional vocal producer
  signifies a co-producer
  signifies an additional producer
  signifies a Pro Tools producer
  signifies a remixer

Personnel
Credits adapted from the liner notes of Fear of Flying.Performers and musicians Robert Aaron – horn
 Beenie Man – vocals
 Michael Cain – keyboards
 Joe Davi – acoustic guitar
 Rick Davies – horn
 Traci Hale – backing vocals
 Norman Hedman – percussion
 Sean Hurley – bass guitar
 Jadakiss – vocals
 Elijah Joy – voice-over
 Jordan Knight – vocals
 Lisa "Left Eye" Lopes – vocals
 Maiesha Rashad – voice-over
 Marlon Williams – guitarTechnical'''

 Mya – vocals (lead and background), production, executive production
 Jerry Duplessis – production
 A. Islam Haqq – production, executive production
 Wyclef Jean – production
 Rodney Jerkins – production
 Kandi Burruss – co-production
 Pro-Jay – programming, production
 Chris "Tricky" Stewart – keyboards, programming, production
 Swizz Beatz – production
 Robin Thicke – programming, production
 Anthony Dent – programming, production
 Brandon Abeln – engineering
 Ralph Cacciurri – engineering
 Keith Cohen – engineering
 Kevin Crouse – engineering
 Chris Frame – engineering
 Brad Gilderman – engineering
 Jason Groucott – engineering, mix engineering
 Tal Herzberg – engineering
 Adam Holmstead – engineering
 Ricco Lumpkins – engineering
 Michael Sherman – engineering
 Brian "B Luv" Thomas – engineering
 Darrel Thorpe – engineering
 Richard Travali – engineering, mix engineering
 Dylan Vaughan – mix engineering
 Kieran Wagner – engineering
 Doug Woulson – engineering
 Kevin "KD" Davis – mixing, mix engineering
 Glen Marchese – mixing
 Manny Marroquin – mixing
 Tony Maserati – mixing
 Chris Athens – mastering

Charts

Weekly charts

Year-end charts

Certifications

Release history

Notes

References

2000 albums
Albums produced by Jerry Duplessis
Albums produced by Jimmy Jam and Terry Lewis
Albums produced by Robin Thicke
Albums produced by Rodney Jerkins
Albums produced by Soulshock and Karlin
Albums produced by Swizz Beatz
Albums produced by Trackmasters
Albums produced by Tricky Stewart
Albums produced by Wyclef Jean
Albums recorded at Chung King Studios
Albums recorded at Westlake Recording Studios
Hip hop soul albums
Interscope Records albums
Mýa albums